Ingraham Ebenezer Bill (19 February 1805 – 4 August 1891) was a Canadian author, journalist, and minister from Billtown, Nova Scotia.

Bill was orphaned at an early age, and found his guidance from an older brother and his minister, Edward Manning. He grew up with strong ties to public duty and the Baptist church.

Bill was important to maritime history because of his role in the development of their Baptist Churches and the documentation of the history surrounding this growth.

References

External links
 

19th-century Canadian Baptist ministers
Canadian male journalists
Journalists from Nova Scotia
Writers from Nova Scotia
People from Kings County, Nova Scotia
1805 births
1891 deaths
19th-century Canadian journalists
19th-century Canadian male writers